KDJS (1590 AM) is a radio station licensed to Willmar, Minnesota, United States. The station is currently owned by Iowa City Broadcasting Company.

On November 1, 2019, KDJS changed their format from classic country to conservative talk, branded as "Fox News Radio 1590/105.7".

Programming
KDJS is the place to go for conservative talk. The station also carries Minnesota Twins baseball, Minnesota Gophers Football and Minnesota Gophers basketball and The Rush Limbaugh Show.

The station signed on FM translator K289CO at 105.7 FM on June 15, 2018.

Previous logo

References

External links

Radio stations in Minnesota
News and talk radio stations in the United States
Radio stations established in 1961
Conservative talk radio